W15 may refer to:

 London W15, a fictitious borough of West London in the TV series Family Affairs
 Mercedes-Benz W15, a car made by Mercedes-Benz made from 1932 to 1937
 Workhorse W-15, a 2010s prototype battery-electric pickup truck
 W15, a bus route in London
 W15 warhead, the missile warhead of the Mark 15 nuclear bomb
 1-Phenylethylpiperidylidene-2-(4-chlorophenyl)sulfonamide (W-15), an opioid originally patented in Canada in 1984.

See also

 Highway 15W
 Vega flight VV15 (11 July 2019)
 
 
 
 V15 (disambiguation)
 U15 (disambiguation)
 15 (disambiguation)
 W (disambiguation)